Blood and Honor: Youth Under Hitler, 1982 (aka Blut und Ehre – Jugend unter Hitler) is a German/American made for TV mini-series which was a co-production between Daniel Wilson Productions and S.W.F (Südwestfunk) and Taurus-Film GmbH.

The original screenplay was by Helmut Kissel and was partly based on his own experience as a member of the Hitler Youth.  The scripts that were eventually shot, however, were written by Robert Muller.  Helmut Kissel led as the director of the project but was replaced by Bernd Fischerauer within the first couple of weeks when shooting started.  The shooting was on location in Baden-Baden, West Germany with the first 4 weeks in August 1980 and the rest of the production was completed between January through March in 1981.

Each scene was shot both in English and in German and resulted in two versions of the film. The post production of the German version was completed in spring of 1982. It premiered on West German TV in July 1982 and was watched by more than 50% of the available audience.  The American version premiered in November 1982 on various independent television stations in the United States (KBHK-44, WPIX-TV, etc.).  Blood and Honor: Youth Under Hitler also received a Peabody Award in 1982 and was shown in 7 countries, including the Netherlands, UK, Austria, and Israel.

References

External links
 
 Blut und Ehre - Jugend unter Hitler (trailer for the DVD issue, German)

World War II television drama series
German drama television series
1980s American drama television series
1982 German television series debuts
1982 American television series debuts
1982 German television series endings
1982 American television series endings
English-language television shows
German-language television shows
Peabody Award-winning television programs
Films about Nazi Germany
Hitler Youth
Das Erste original programming